Oscar Soetewey (13 January 1925 – 8 January 1988) was a Belgian middle-distance runner. He competed in the men's 800 metres at the 1952 Summer Olympics.

References

External links
  

1925 births
1988 deaths
Athletes (track and field) at the 1952 Summer Olympics
Belgian male middle-distance runners
Olympic athletes of Belgium